Gaon Thor Pudhari Chor is 2017 Indian Marathi-language film directed by Pitambar Kale and produced by Mangesh Doiphode under banner of Mangesh Movies. Gaon Thor Pudhari Chor was released on 17 February 2017.

This new film presents a light comedy on some amazing political moves in a simplest possible ways.

Cast 
 Digambar Naik 
 Prema Kiran 
 Chetan Dalvi 
 Siya Patil 
 Kanchan Bhor 
 Prakash Dotre 
 Jairaj Nair 
 Anshumala Patil 
 Datta Thorat 
 Parag Chaudhari 
 Sunil Godabole 
 Arun Khandagale 
 Suresh Deshmukh 
 Somanath Shelar

Plot 
The film's screenplay does not spare the ruling party as well as opposition party, presenting their gimmicks to remain in limelight, while pulling each other's legs. In short, all the politicians will be target in this film. And the makers of this film are confident that their film would offer total entertain to the Marathi audience.

Production 
The film is produced by Mangesh Doiphode under his own production company Mangesh Movies Enterprise. The film is written by Pitambar Kale and Laxmikant Vispute.

Soundtrack 
Music given by Nadu Honap

References

External links 
 

2017 films
Indian drama films
2010s Marathi-language films